Gartnait, son of Domelch, (died 595) was a king of the Picts from 584 to 595.

The Pictish Chronicle king lists contained in the Poppleton Manuscript have Gartnait following Bridei son of Maelchon whose death c. 584 is recorded by the Irish annals. Gartnait's death is noted in the Annals of Tigernach c. 599 and the king lists have him succeeded by Nechtan nepos Uerb.

Some versions of the king list associate Gartnait with the foundation of the monastery of Abernethy, although other variants associate this either with Nechtan nepos Uerb or the similarly named pre-historic king Nechtan son of Erp.

John Bannerman proposed that this Gartnait was to be identified with the son of Áedán mac Gabráin found in the genealogies known as Cethri Primchenela dail Riata attached to the Senchus fer n-Alban, and furthermore with the Gartnait whose kin were active on the isle of Skye during the 7th and early 8th centuries. T. F. O'Rahilly had earlier rejected the identification of "Gartnait son of Áedán" with the eponym of the Skye kindred who is called Gartnait son of Accidán in the Irish annals. The most recent study, by Fraser, rejects the existence of Gartnait son of Áedán outright, presuming this person to have been a genealogical fiction created in the early 8th century to bolster the ambitions of Cenél nGartnait, descendants of Gartnait son of Accidán, to rule in Kintyre.

Notes

References

External links
 CELT: Corpus of Electronic Texts at University College Cork includes the Annals of Ulster, Tigernach, the Four Masters and Innisfallen, the Chronicon Scotorum, the Lebor Bretnach (which includes the Duan Albanach), Genealogies, and various Saints' Lives. Most are translated into English, or translations are in progress.
 Annals of Clonmacnoise at Cornell

6th-century births
595 deaths
Pictish monarchs
6th-century Scottish monarchs